Cliniodes insignialis is a moth in the family Crambidae. It was described by James E. Hayden in 2011. It is found in southern Brazil, north to Rio de Janeiro.

Adults have been recorded on wing nearly year round, except August.

References

Moths described in 2011
Eurrhypini